SmackDown is a brand of the American professional wrestling promotion WWE that was established on March 25, 2002. Brands are divisions of WWE's roster where wrestlers are assigned to perform on a weekly basis when a brand extension is in effect. Wrestlers assigned to SmackDown primarily appear on the brand's weekly television program, Friday Night SmackDown, also referred to simply as SmackDown. It is one of WWE's two main brands, along with Raw, collectively referred to as WWE's main roster. The brand was discontinued for a period between August 2011 and July 2016.

In addition to the television program, SmackDown wrestlers also perform on the branded and co-branded pay-per-view and livestreaming events. During the first brand split (2002–2011), SmackDown wrestlers also competed on an exclusive supplementary show, Velocity, and on ECW under a talent exchange program with the former ECW brand, while during the second brand split (2016–present), the brand's wrestlers have appeared in the interbrand Mixed Match Challenge, Worlds Collide, and annual Tribute to the Troops events.

History

First split (2002–2011)

In its conception, according to Bruce Prichard in his Something to Wrestle podcast released in October 2018, the then World Wrestling Federation (WWF) originally planned to make SmackDown! an all-women's brand but ultimately decided against it because of the lack of talent.

In March 2002, WWF underwent the "brand extension", a process in which WWE divided itself into two branches with separate rosters, storylines and authority figures. The two divisions, hosted by and named after Raw and SmackDown!, would compete against each other. The split resulted from WWE purchasing its two biggest competitors, World Championship Wrestling (WCW) and Extreme Championship Wrestling (ECW); and the subsequent doubling of its roster and championships. The brand extension was made public during a telecast of Raw on March 18, initiated with the first draft a week later on the March 25 episode of Raw and became official on the April 1 episode of Raw.

Wrestlers began to wrestle exclusively for their specific show. At the time, this excluded the WWE Undisputed Championship and WWE Women's Championship as those WWE titles would be defended on both shows. In August 2002, then WWE Undisputed Champion, Brock Lesnar, refused to defend the title on Raw, in effect causing his title to become exclusive to SmackDown!. The following week on Raw, Raw General Manager Eric Bischoff awarded a newly instated World Heavyweight Championship to Raw's designated number one contender Triple H. Accordingly, Lesnar's championship was no longer deemed "undisputed". Following this, the WWE Women's Championship soon became a Raw exclusive as well. As a result of the brand extension, an annual "draft lottery" was instituted to exchange members of each roster and generally refresh the lineups.

SmackDown! was the home brand for many top WWE stars including Eddie Guerrero, Batista, Big Show, John "Bradshaw" Layfield (JBL), Kurt Angle, Edge, The Undertaker, Rey Mysterio, John Cena, and Torrie Wilson. Guerrero would go on to become the WWE Champion as part of the show, thus becoming the main feature of SmackDown! throughout 2004 and the most popular wrestler of that year. The biggest star of the next decade, John Cena, started his WWE career on this brand and rose to stardom as "Doctor of Thuganomics" on the show, eventually winning his first WWE Championship during his tenure on the brand.

On June 6, then WWE Champion John Cena switched brands from SmackDown! to Raw as part of the month-long 2005 draft lottery. This effectively left SmackDown! without a world title. On the June 23 episode of SmackDown!, SmackDown! General Manager Theodore Long scheduled a six-man elimination match between Booker T, Chris Benoit, Christian (replacing Big Show, who was picked by Raw in the lottery), John "Bradshaw" Layfield, Muhammad Hassan and The Undertaker to crown the first SmackDown! Champion. On the June 30 episode of SmackDown!, JBL won the match, but Long appeared afterward and stated that even though he had won the match SmackDown! did not need a championship anymore, instead revealing that JBL was the number one contender for the World Heavyweight Championship, at which point Batista, then World Heavyweight Champion, entered the ring as SmackDown!'s final draft lottery pick.

At the SmackDown! taping on January 10, 2006, that aired January 13, Batista had to forfeit the World Heavyweight Championship because of a legitimate triceps injury suffered at the hands of Mark Henry the previous week. Long decreed a battle royal for the vacant title, which was won by Kurt Angle, who was on the Raw brand, but switched to the SmackDown! brand for the duration of his reign as champion. On the April 7 episode of SmackDown! (which was taped on April 4), Long revived the King of the Ring tournament after a four-year hiatus as a SmackDown! exclusive tournament. The tournament ended at Judgment Day with Booker T as the winner, defeating Bobby Lashley in the final.

On October 16, 2007, the SmackDown! and ECW brands began a talent exchange, allowing their respective talent to appear and compete on either brand, as ECW was broadcast live from the same arena where SmackDown! was taped.

During the 2008 WWE draft, WWE Champion Triple H was drafted to SmackDown, resulting in two world championships appearing on the brand – Edge was the World Heavyweight Champion at the time – and leaving Raw without a world title. However, Edge was attacked by Batista on the June 30 episode of Raw and immediately afterwards CM Punk cashed in his Money in the Bank contract to become World Heavyweight Champion, bringing the World Heavyweight Championship back to Raw for the first time since 2005. Also that year, for the first time in the brand's history a women's exclusive championship was introduced, the Divas Championship, a counterpart to the Women's Championship that had been the only active championship competed for by Divas, but which was exclusive to Raw, meaning that the Divas on SmackDown had no championship to compete for. Michelle McCool became the inaugural champion by defeating Natalya on July 20 at The Great American Bash.

On February 15, 2009, at No Way Out, Edge won the World Heavyweight Championship in Raw's Elimination Chamber match, thus making it a SmackDown exclusive title and giving SmackDown two top tier championships. As a result of the 2009 WWE draft in April, then WWE Champion Triple H was drafted to Raw while the World Heavyweight Championship also moved to the Raw brand after Edge lost the title to Cena at WrestleMania 25, once again leaving SmackDown without a world title. SmackDown regained the World Heavyweight Championship at Backlash when Edge invoked his WrestleMania rematch clause and defeated Cena in a Last Man Standing match to win the championship back. In addition, Raw and SmackDown exchanged both women-exclusive championships with Raw gaining the Divas Championship and SmackDown gaining the Women's Championship. This marked the first time in history that the Women's Championship had ever been exclusive to SmackDown. Raw and SmackDown also exchanged the United States Championship (which became exclusive to Raw) and the Intercontinental Championship (subsequently exclusive to SmackDown) for the first time since August 25, 2002.

On the August 29, 2011, episode of Raw, it was announced that performers from Raw and SmackDown were no longer exclusive to their respective brand. Subsequently, championships previously exclusive to one show or the other were available for wrestlers from any show to compete for—this would mark the end of the brand extension as all programming and live events featured the full WWE roster. In a 2013 interview with Advertising Age, Stephanie McMahon explained that WWE's decision to end the brand extension was due to wanting their content to flow across television and online platforms.

Second split (2016–present)
On May 25, 2016, it was revealed that the brand split would return in July. The 2016 WWE draft took place on the live premiere episode of SmackDown on July 19 to determine the rosters between both brands. On the July 11 episode of Raw, Vince McMahon named Shane McMahon the commissioner of SmackDown. Then next week on Raw, Daniel Bryan was revealed as the new SmackDown General Manager. Due to Raw being a three-hour show and SmackDown being a two-hour show, Raw received three picks each round and SmackDown received two. WWE Champion Dean Ambrose was SmackDown's first pick.

After the return of the brand split, most pay-per-views became exclusive to one brand, (with SmackDown producing Backlash (2016 and 2017), No Mercy (2016), TLC (2016), Elimination Chamber (2017), Money in the Bank (2017), Battleground (2017), Hell in a Cell (2017), Clash of Champions (2017) and Fastlane (2018)). From WrestleMania 34 onwards, all pay-per-views became dual-branded again.

On the November 7, 2017, episode of SmackDown, AJ Styles defeated Jinder Mahal for the WWE Championship. On April 10, 2018, SmackDown Commissioner Shane McMahon announced that Daniel Bryan was back as a full-time WWE Superstar for the roster after his in-ring return at WrestleMania 34, therefore "graciously accepted Daniel's resignation as SmackDown General Manager". McMahon then named Paige, who had retired from in-ring competition due to injury the night before on Raw, as the new SmackDown General Manager.

When SmackDown moved to FOX beginning with the October 4, 2019, episode, it eventually replaced Raw as the "A" Show. As a result, SmackDown became the home for the WWE's top stars such as Roman Reigns, Brock Lesnar, Drew McIntyre and the Usos.

Champions 

Initially, the Undisputed WWE Championship and the original WWE Women's Championship were available to both brands. The other championships were exclusive to the brand the champion was a part of. When the brand extension began, SmackDown became the exclusive home for the World Tag Team Championship and the original Cruiserweight Championship.

In September 2002, the Undisputed Championship became the WWE Championship again and was moved to SmackDown, prompting Raw General Manager Eric Bischoff to create the World Heavyweight Championship for Raw. SmackDown created the WWE Tag Team Championship and they revived the United States Championship. Over the course of the first brand extension, these championships switched between brands, usually due to the result of the annual draft. However, the Cruiserweight title was the only championship to never switch brands, staying on SmackDown from 2002 until the championship's retirement on September 28, 2007.

In October 2007, SmackDown and ECW began a talent exchange agreement, which meant that SmackDown talent could appear on ECW and vice versa. This allowed the United States Championship and WWE Tag Team Championship to be shared between the two brands. In July 2008, the Divas Championship was created for SmackDown, allowing the SmackDown Divas to compete for a title.

With the brand extension ending in 2011, all Raw and SmackDown titles were merged. After five years, a new brand extension was introduced on July 19, 2016. SmackDown drafted the WWE Champion and the Intercontinental Champion. As SmackDown was lacking a tag team championship and a women's championship, Shane McMahon and Daniel Bryan introduced the SmackDown Tag Team Championship and SmackDown Women's Championship. In the 2017 Superstar Shake-Up, the Intercontinental Championship was moved to Raw and in exchange, the United States Championship moved back to SmackDown. The following year during the 2018 Superstar Shake-Up, the United States Championship was moved to Raw, but returned to SmackDown the next night. At Crown Jewel on October 31, 2019, SmackDown wrestler "The Fiend" Bray Wyatt won the Universal Championship, thus bringing the title to SmackDown. On the next night's episode of SmackDown, WWE Champion Brock Lesnar quit SmackDown and went to Raw, taking the title with him.

Current championships

 Note – The WWE Women's Tag Team Championship can also be defended on SmackDown as it is shared among the brands

Previous championships

Pay-per-view and WWE Network events

First brand split events

Second brand split events

Notes

References 

WWE SmackDown
WWE brands
2002 establishments in the United States
2011 disestablishments in the United States
2016 establishments in the United States